The elections for the Chandigarh Municipal Corporation were held in December 2001. The candidates were in fray for the election to 20 seats (wards) of Chandigarh union territory.

Results 
Congress party won 13 seats out of total 20 and was the single largest party. BJP won 3 seats and its alliance partner Shiromani Akali Dal (SAD) won 1 seat. Chandigarh Vikas Manch won 3 seats.

Aftermath
The Chandigarh Municipal Corporation council completed its tenure of 5 years. 2006 Chandigarh Municipal Corporation election were the next MC elections.

References

Chandigarh
Elections in Chandigarh
2000s in Chandigarh
2001 elections in India